Copenhagen Distortion is a celebration of "Copenhagen Night Life and New Dance Music". With an estimated 100,000 guests per day, it is one of the largest annual gatherings in Europe. The Distortion week starts with 20-40 street parties in the Nørrebro and Vesterbro districts – with an "anything goes" music profile – and the week ends with the Distortion Ø festival with six to ten stages on an industrial island in the Copenhagen harbour – with focus on new dance music: hiphop, trap, world, house, experimental and techno.

History 
The idea of ultra-mobility and the tag-line "Distortion — A Celebration of Copenhagen Nightlife" was born in September 1998 for a one-night party in the nightclub Mantra in Tivoli, Copenhagen, established by Thomas Fleurquin.
Distortion became a five-day mobile festival in June 2000. In the period 1998–2007, Distortion was a small, chaotic, not-fully-legal five-day party-crawl through Copenhagen, mainly for the local underground art and music scene and club culture professionals. In 2007, after gathering 2000 guests at a single street party for the first time, Distortion decided to go professional and entered a collaboration with the Copenhagen City Council and the Copenhagen Police: Nus/Nus – the Distortion Secretariat was established.
In 2011, according to the Copenhagen Police, Distortion had 80,000-100,000 visitors per day, becoming one of the largest annual gatherings in Europe. In 2012, Distortion established  (the Copenhagen Distortion Foundation).

Distortion often invites local and international shops, labels, nightclubs, promoters, and magazines to host their own party through the week; over the years this has included Vice Magazine, Fabric – London, Resident Advisor, Adidas, Ed Bangers, Kompakt, Trouw – Amsterdam, Fact Magazine, and Red Bull Music Academy.

Distortion Street, Distortion Club, Distortion Ø

Street parties 
In the daytime, from 4:00 p.m. to 10:00 p.m., Distortion orchestrates 20-40 street parties, each day in one Copenhagen district: Nørrebro on Wednesday and Vesterbro on Thursday. The street parties are hosted by the local sound system: shops, nightclubs, residents, galleries, labels, magazines, and bars. Distortion is famous around the world for its intense party energy and turning the entire city into a giant nightclub, but there are also events for children, pop-up street restaurants and a stage for international classical music. The streets of Copenhagen are jam-packed, and transformed by the thousands of guests dancing and loving life and music together.

Distortion Club 
At night, Distortion hosts an international festival for modern club music. Distortion Club takes place in nightclubs, regular venues and one-off locations like swimming pools, under bridges, in museums, the Royal Theatre, and warehouses. Names like Hot Chip, Simian Mobile Disco, Spank Rock, Sebastien Tellier, Diplo and M.I.A. played at Distortion Club events years before they became music heroes of international scope. Admission is with single tickets or the Distortion Pass.

Distortion Ø  
Distortion Ø is the main event of the Distortion week, previously known as the Final Party. With 14,000–15,000 guests over two days, it is the largest event in Northern Europe for new electronic music (hiphop, grime, bass, house, electronic pop, experimental and techno). The labyrinth-like site is located on a former industrial island in the Copenhagen harbour. The six to ten dance floors are both outdoors and indoors, in small forests and in containers with the legendary "techno-tunnel". The backdrops combine the Copenhagen skyline and the industrial harbour zone. Admission is via the Distortion Ø ticket or Distortion Pass.

Distortion Camping 
Distortion Camping is located on the island Refshaleøen, 200 meters from the Distortion Ø site and a few minutes from public transportation (bus and boat). Distortion Camping includes the Distortion chill-out area, right across from the Little Mermaid – and offers views of both sunset and sunrise by the waterfront.

See also
List of electronic music festivals

References

External links 
 Distortion website
 Wonderful Copenhagen (official tourist information website)
 Copenhagen Distortion 2012 Archive page on Choose Fest
 [https://www.royalwordmedia.com/2020/05/distortion-copenhagen-denmark-2020.html 

Festivals in Copenhagen
Recurring events established in 1998
Electronic music festivals in Denmark
Summer events in Denmark